USS Californian was a United States Navy cargo ship in commission in 1918.

SS Californian was launched on 12 May 1900 at San Francisco, California, by Union Iron Works and delivered later that year to the American-Hawaiian Steamship Company of New York City. After the United States entered World War I, the United States Shipping Board acquired Californian for war service and transferred her to the U.S. Navy on 13 May 1918. The Navy commissioned her as USS Californian on 14 May 1918.

Californian immediately loaded a cargo of coal, fuel oil, and general supplies for the American Expeditionary Force in France and departed on 31 May 1918 to join a convoy off New York City.

On 22 June 1918, while proceeding through the Bay of Biscay, Californian struck a naval mine. Although a gallant attempt was made to tow her to port, she sank later that day. Her crew abandoned ship in good order and was picked up by the patrol vessel USS Corsair (SP-159) without suffering any casualties.

Unlike most commercial ships commissioned into U.S. Navy service during World War I, Californian never received a naval registry identification number.

References

Department of the Navy: Naval Historical Center Online Library of Selected Images: U.S. Navy Ships: USS Californian (1918-1918). Originally the Civilian Freighter Californian (1900).
NavSource Online: Section Patrol Craft Photo Archive: Arizonan (ID 4245-A)

World War I cargo ships of the United States
Ships built in San Francisco
World War I shipwrecks in the Atlantic Ocean
1900 ships
Cargo ships of the United States Navy
Ships sunk by mines
Maritime incidents in 1918
Steamships of the United States
Ships built by Union Iron Works